The Three Seals Law or Three Seals Code is a collection of law texts compiled in 1805 on the orders of King Rama I of Siam. Most of the texts were laws from the Ayutthaya era which had survived the destruction of Ayutthaya in 1767. The compilation remained the working law of Siam until partially replaced by modern law codes in the early 20th century. The texts are an important source for the history of the Ayutthaya Kingdom and legal history in Asia.

Parts of the Three Seals Law are still in force, according to a ruling of the Supreme Court of Justice of Thailand in 1978.

Background
King Rama I paid attention to the preservation of Thai texts that had survived the destruction of Ayutthaya in 1767, including the royal chronicles and religious texts. Shortly after completing a revision of the Tipiṭaka, the Buddhist canonical scriptures, in 1804, he turned his attention to the laws.

After a court awarded a divorce to a woman, Amdaeng Pom, even though she had committed adultery, her husband, Bunsi, sent a petition, claiming the judge had been biased. On examination, all copies of the marriage law showed the woman had the legal right to this divorce. Suspecting that this and others laws had been “modified,” King Rama I ordered a revision of all existing law texts:
	
Hence the king graciously commanded that subjects with knowledge be assigned to cleanse (chamra) the royal decrees and laws in the palace library from the Thammasat onwards; ensure they are correct in every detail according to the Pali with no inconsistencies in their content; arrange them into chapters and groups; and take pains to cleanse and adjust any aberrations to accord with justice, in keeping with the king’s gracious intent to be of benefit to kings who reign over the realm in future. (Royal preface to the Three Seals Law) 

The royally appointed commission, consisting of three judges, four royal scribes, and four officials from the Department of Royal Teachers, completed the task in 11 months, producing 27 laws in a total of 41 volumes of the accordion-style book known as samut thai khao. Each law was stamped with the seals of the ministries of Mahatthai (north), Kalahom (south), and Phrakhlang (treasury), hence the name of the compilation. Three working copies were made, kept in the Royal Bedchamber, court of justice, and the Palace Library, respectively. A fourth copy was made shortly after and stored as a backup.

As a result of neglect, the volumes were lost and scattered. In 1980, a search located 80 volumes from the three original copies and 17 volumes from the backup.

Parts of the Three Seals Law were replaced by modern laws drafted with the help of foreign advisers in a Penal Code promulgated in 1908 and a Civil and Commercial Code promulgated in parts between 1923 and 1935.

In 1978, the Supreme Court of Justice of Thailand ruled that the parts of the Three Seals Law not having been replaced or overruled by any other subsequent laws remain in force still. Those parts include Lak Inthaphat (Tenets of Indra).

Contents
In the table below, the laws are listed in the order they were approved in 1805 with the original titles and original Thai spelling, taken from facsimile texts published by the Royal Institute (now the Royal Society of Thailand). Some of the 27 listed texts contained multiple laws, giving a total of 41 laws. In subsequent publications, some titles were changed, and some laws amalgamated. The ‘pp’ column shows the number of pages of each law in the Khurusapha edition, as a gauge of relative length. The dates shown are as given in the prefaces of the laws. The era used for the dating of each text is in Chula Sakarat, many of these dates have clearly been corrupted during copying.

Publication
In 1849, Mot Amatyakun and the American missionary Dan Beach Bradley printed an edition of the Three Seals Law. King Rama III objected and had the books destroyed. One copy of the first volume survived (now in the National Library of Thailand), and the planned second volume may never have been printed.

In 1862–3, Dan Beach Bradley, with the permission of King Rama IV (Mongkut), printed the edition planned in 1849 in two volumes under the title Nangsue rueang kotmai mueang thai (Book on laws of Siam). The edition was printed ten times and widely used.

In 1938-9, a modern edition was prepared by the French legal scholar Robert Lingat and published in three volumes by Thammasat University under the title Pramuan kotmai ratchakan thi 1 C.S. 1166 phim tam chabap luang tra sam duang (Law code of King Rama I, 1805, printed following the Three Seals edition). All modern editions stem from this work.

In 1962-3, Ongkankha Khong Khurusapha (government printers for textbooks, etc.) published a 5-volume edition, based on the Thammasat University edition with corrections, entitled Kotmai tra sam duang (Three Seals Code). A third edition appeared in 1994.

To mark the 200th anniversary of the compilation of the Three Seals Law, the Royal Institute (now the Royal Society of Thailand) published a two-volume edition in 2007 with facsimiles of the manuscripts and transcription, entitled Kotmai tra sam duang: chabap ratchabandittayasathan (Three Seals Code, Royal Institute edition).

Scholarship
Robert Lingat, editor of the 1938-9 edition of the Three Seals Law, published several articles and books on the historical antecedents of the law, and on the law on slavery.

In 1957, MR Seni Pramoj, a lawyer and former prime minister, gave a lecture in Thai summarizing the Three Seals Law, subsequently published as a book.

In 1986, Yoneo Ishii published an English-language summary and analysis of the Three Seals Law. Ishii also headed a project at Kyoto University to produce a computer concordance of the complete text. Access to this database is available through the Center of Integrated Study at Kyoto University, and through the Ayutthaya Digital Archive Project of the Chulachomklao Royal Military Academy (see External Links below).

Michael Vickery published two articles querying the accuracy of the dates appearing in the prefaces off the Three Seals Law texts.

Tamara Loos traced the replacement of the Three Seals Law by modern laws in a Cornell University doctoral thesis published in 2002.

On the occasion of the 200th anniversary of the Three Seals Law in 2005, several researches were published by Thai scholars including Winai Pongsripian, Krisda Boonyasmit, Woraphon Phuphongphan, Pimpan Paiboonwangcharoen, Jakkrit Uttho, and Channarong Bunnun.

References

Citations

Sources

External links
Computer Concordance to the Three Seals Law by Ishii et al. at CIAS, Kyoto
Computer Concordance to the Three Seals Law by Ishii et al. at CRMA, Thailand

Legal history of Thailand
1805 in Siam
Legal codes